BankGiroLoterij was the name of a Dutch professional road bicycle racing team.  The main sponsor from 1999 to 2004 was a Dutch lottery operator BankGiro Loterij .  No sponsor was available for 2005, so the team disbanded.  At that time, they were placed 29th in Division 1 in the UCI Road World Rankings. A significant number of the team riders joined Team Shimano-Memory Corp, after its merge with Japanese team Shimano.

References
Trap-Friis.dk (team data)

Defunct cycling teams based in the Netherlands
Cycling teams based in the Netherlands
Cycling teams established in 1999
Cycling teams disestablished in 2004
2004 disestablishments in the Netherlands
1999 establishments in the Netherlands